Scott John Wilson (born 10 January 2000) is an English professional footballer who plays as a central defender for National League North side Chorley.

Career
Wilson began his career at Burnley, making 21 appearances in all competitions on loan for Stalybridge Celtic during the first half of the 2018–19 season. He moved on loan to Blyth Spartans in January 2020.

He signed for Barrow in September 2020.

After being released by Barrow at the end of the 2020-21 season, he signed for Curzon Ashton in the National League North in August 2021. He moved to Chorley in July 2022.

Career statistics

References

2000 births
Living people
English footballers
Burnley F.C. players
Stalybridge Celtic F.C. players
Blyth Spartans A.F.C. players
Barrow A.F.C. players
Curzon Ashton F.C. players
Chorley F.C. players
National League (English football) players
Northern Premier League players
English Football League players
Association football defenders